Lukáš Skovajsa (born 27 March 1994) is a Slovak footballer who plays for Dynamo České Budějovice as a defender.

Club career
He made his professional debut for AS Trenčín against Nitra, on 6 October 2012.

In January 2020, he joined Romanian club Dinamo București. he was released by Dinamo only eight months later.

Career statistics

Honours

Club
AS Trenčín
 Fortuna Liga (2): 2014–15, 2015-16
Slovak Cup (2): 2014–15, 2015-16

References

External links
AS Trenčín profile 
Corgoň Liga profile 

1994 births
Living people
Sportspeople from Trenčín
Slovak footballers
Slovakia under-21 international footballers
Association football defenders
AS Trenčín players
FC Dinamo București players
SK Dynamo České Budějovice players
Slovak Super Liga players
Liga I players
Czech First League players
Slovak expatriate footballers
Slovak expatriate sportspeople in Romania
Expatriate footballers in Romania
Slovak expatriate sportspeople in the Czech Republic
Expatriate footballers in the Czech Republic